The 1987 World Table Tennis Championships men's doubles was the 39th edition of the men's doubles championship.

Wei Qingguang and Chen Longcan won the title after defeating Ilija Lupulesku and Zoran Primorac in the final by two sets to one.

Results

See also
List of World Table Tennis Championships medalists

References

-